Wildeshausen (Low Saxon: Wilshusen) is a town and the capital of the Oldenburg district in Lower Saxony, Germany. It is situated by the river Hunte.

History
In 1648, Wildeshausen and the surrounding district was ceded to Sweden, in the Peace of Westphalia, where it was given as a fief to Gustav Gustavsson af Vasaborg, an illegitimate son of King Gustavus Adolphus, as a part of the Swedish Dominion of Bremen-Verden. In 1679, following the Treaty of Nijmegen, it was pawned, to the prince-bishop of Münster, in exchange for a loan of 100,000 Riksdaler.

Attractions
There are stone monuments and old burial places dating to the third millennium BC. One of these areas, Kleinenkneter Steine, was reconstructed in the 1930s. The local Tourist Center, located in the old Rathaus (Town hall) has maps for tours and walks.

Kurpark
The "Kurpark" has a fountain, concert-shell and a wading pool and is in the Luftkurort (fresh air park) Wildeshausen. 
During the summer month concerts take place every Sunday morning at 11 a.m. The tattoo (or tabs) occurs on Pfingst Sonntag, (Pentecost Sunday) at night, when the "Schützengilde" from 1403 presents a firework to open the traditional "Gildefest".

St.Peter Church
An ecumenical ceremony on November 27, 1998  re-opened the St. Peter Church for divine services. From August 2, 1997 until then the Roman Catholic Church used the facilities of the Alexander Church by invitation.
The church had to be closed because of structural problems. 16 months were needed for re-construction.
From 1699 on the Alexander Church was used for evangelic Lutheran services. During this year Sweden became the ruling faction. The Catholics bought a house with several additional buildings and out of a barn "a church like building" was developed. During 1700 to 1803 Hannover ruled, Catholics were not allowed to build a new church. Only in 1810, when Oldenburg took over Wildeshausen the Catholics were allowed freedom to follow their religion. They built their church, which opened on November 24, 1811. The church had to be closed again due to structural mistakes, making it unsafe. In 1824 the current church was finally built, without a tower. The tower was erected in 1910. 
"The times of division between the religious communities are, thank God, over now" was stated by R. Gryczan/H.Holtmann.

Marketplace
In the middle of Wildeshausen is the marketplace. The pointed gables of the surrounding houses faced the street. On the remaining houses stone façades have replaced the former wooden gables. The "Markt Brunnen"(fountain) was built in 1747 by master Theophil from Bremen.This fountain was used for drinking by men and animals.  Wildeshausen was located on an old trade route. In pagan times an "Irmen Säule "  stood here. After the town was "captured by Münster" in 1529 the Mayor Jakob Lickenberg was executed here. A stone by the Market Brunnen in the Market Place is in memory of this. In 1990 Wildeshausen erected a new town hall with "Glockenspiel" and moving figures.

Waltbert
In the "Westerstraße" there is a sculpture, Waltbert.  In 851, Waltbert, a grandson of Widukind, brought the relics of St. Alexander from Rome to Wildeshausen to further Christianity in the sparsely populated area. The sculpture shows Waltbert on his horse, in his hands the relic of St. Alexander. Then follows his name, the year 851 and the word "translatio". The "translatio Alexandri" once was described by the monks of Fulda.

Whitsun: "Gildefest"
A week-long festival, the "Gildfest", has occurred in Wildeshausen on Whitsun (German: Pfingsten) since 1403.  The Mayor is the General of the Guild. The town  director is the chief of protocol (Major). A related expression is: "The town of Wildeshausen is the "Schützengilde" and the Schützengilde is the town of Wildeshausen". A granite sculpture, called "cylinder", by A. Boldt  represents the Schützengilde in the inner city.

Alexander Church

The founding of the Alexander Church goes back to 814.  In 807 Waltbert, a grandson of Duke Wittekind, brought the relics of the sainted Alexander from Rome by way of the Alpine mountains to Wildeshausen. Alexander died, as well as his mother and 6 brothers, as executed martyrs during the persecution of Christians in the first century. Waltbert donated a "Chorherren Stift" (a type of monastery, where the cleric lived to the rules of the Benedictines) named "Alexander Kapitel". It was to be used as a mission for the surrounding area  (called Lerigau, or Largau).  Wildeshausen became a place of pilgrimage, benefiting it economically. The Church and "Stift" owned treasures and were decorated with pictures. During renovation frescos were discovered.
The Alexander Church is the only basilica in the area of Oldenburg. The style documents the transition from the late Roman to the early gothic style of the 13th century.

Pestruper Burial Ground
In the Bronze Age, when bronze replaced the hard to produce stone tools, the inhabitants of this area remained here.
They began to en-tomb their dead now in burial grounds.

The Pestruper Burial Ground is the only preserved such structure in Europe. It is situated about 800 meters from the river Hunte.500 tombs, different in form and size, are evidence of the settlement that 600 years B.C. buried their urns with the ashes there. For each individual urn a hill would be erected, created with sods of grass. During the examination of the "kings tombs (Königshügel) traces of the earlier stone age. Ritual plough traces from the Bronze Age were discovered.  1100-700 B.C.

The 'kings tombs' (Königshügel) consist of burials from different ages (late Bronze Age to pre-Roman Iron Age). The farmers, breeders, hunters and fishermen were contemporaries of  "Ötzi" from the ice age.

People from Wildeshausen 
 Wigald Boning, German comedian and actor
 Jacob H. Muckerheide, Wisconsin politician

International relations

Wildeshausen is twinned with:
 Hertford, United Kingdom
 Évron, France

References

Dominions of Sweden
Oldenburg (district)